DXNU-TV Ch. 41 is a UHF television station owned by Information Broadcast Unlimited (IBU) and operated by Breakthrough and Milestones Productions International (BMPI), the network's content provider and marketing arm and Christian religious organization Members Church of God International (MCGI). The station's transmitter is located at Brgy. Cugman, Cagayan de Oro with the power of 5,000 watts, the same as 107.9 Win Radio Cagayan de Oro.

Television stations in Cagayan de Oro
Television channels and stations established in 1999
Members Church of God International
1999 establishments in the Philippines